The 1966 Philadelphia Eagles season was the franchise's 34th season in the National Football League.

Off Season

NFL draft 
The 1966 NFL draft was held on November 27, 1965, the last year in which the NFL and the AFL had separate drafts. As a result, many players selected by teams from both leagues would choose to play for the more established NFL, or in a rarer case, the AFL. The expansion Atlanta Falcons were awarded the first pick in the draft as well as the final pick in each of the first five rounds. The league also provided the Falcons with an expansion draft six weeks later, selecting players from NFL rosters.

Player selections

Roster

Regular season

Schedule

Standings

Playoff Bowl

Awards and honors 
Pro Bowl Selections
Bob Brown selected starting Tackle.
Floyd Peters is selected as Defensive Tackle

League Leaders
Tim Browns leads league in Kickoff Returns for TDs with 2.
Tim Browns finishes 3 rd in Kick return Avg. with 28.1
Joe Scarpati finishes 2nd in Interception with 8.

References 

 Eagles on Pro Football Reference
 Eagles on jt-sw.com

Philadelphia Eagles seasons
Philadelphia Eagles
Philadel